Wilczkowo may refer to the following places:
Wilczkowo, Kuyavian-Pomeranian Voivodeship (north-central Poland)
Wilczkowo, Masovian Voivodeship (east-central Poland)
Wilczkowo, Warmian-Masurian Voivodeship (north Poland)
Wilczkowo, West Pomeranian Voivodeship (north-west Poland)
Wilczkowo, Świdwin County in West Pomeranian Voivodeship (north-west Poland)